Budry  is a village in Węgorzewo County, Warmian-Masurian Voivodeship, in northern Poland, close to the border with the Kaliningrad Oblast of Russia. It is the seat of the gmina (administrative district) called Gmina Budry. It is located in the historic region of Masuria.

The village has a population of 420.

History
In the late 19th century, the village had a population of 778, predominantly Polish by ethnicity, mostly employed in agriculture.

References

Villages in Węgorzewo County